Robert Dillon, 2nd Earl of Roscommon PC (Ire) (died 1642) was styled Baron Dillon of Kilkenny-West from 1622 to 1641 and succeeded his father only a year before his own death. He supported Strafford, Lord Deputy of Ireland, who appointed him keeper of the great seal. Dillon was in December 1640 for a short while a lord justice of Ireland together with Sir William Parsons.

Birth and origins 
Robert was born in Ireland, the eldest son of James Dillon and his wife Eleanor Barnewall. His father would in 1622 become the 1st Earl of Roscommon. His family was Old English and descended from Sir Henry Dillon who came to Ireland with Prince John in 1185. His family held substantial lands in Meath, Westmeath, Longford and Roscommon.

Robert's mother, who was also called Helen instead of Eleanor, was a daughter of Christopher Barnewall of Turvey House, County Dublin. Like his father's, her family was Old English.

Robert was one of 13 siblings, who are listed on his father's article.

First marriage 
In about 1600 Dillon married Margaret Barry. She was the sixth daughter of David de Barry, 5th Viscount Buttevant, His wife's family, the de Barrys, were Old English like his own.

 
Robert and Margaret had three sons:
 James ({Circa|1605}} – 1649), succeeded as the 3rd Earl Roscommon
 Lucas, died childless
 David, died an infant

Second marriage 
About 1610, Dillon married secondly Dorothy, a Protestant, the fourth daughter of George Hastings, 4th Earl of Huntingdon, an English noble, widow of Sir James Stewart (died 1609), who was a son of Walter Stewart, 1st Lord Blantyre, a Scottish noble.

Robert and Dorothy had a son:
 Henry (died 1640), never married

Advancements 
Dillon had been studying law in London at Gray's Inn and was called to the bar in 1613. He was knighted on 15 February 1615 by James I at Theobalds House, Hertfordshire.

Dillon's parents as well as his first wife were Catholics. His eldest son, James, was originally raised as a Catholic. Dillon as well as his son James conformed to the established religion some time before his father's ennoblement. His father, however, remained Catholic.

On 24 January 1620 Dillon's father was raised to the peerage with the title "Baron Dillon of Kilkenny-West", in the Peerage of Ireland in a ceremony performed by the Lord Deputy Oliver St. John in the presence chamber of Dublin Castle on 25 January.

On 5 August 1622 Dillon's father was advanced to Earl of Roscommon. This made the title "Baron Dillon of Kilkenny-West" available as courtesy title for the heir apparent. Dillon, therefore was 1622–1641 styled "Robert Lord Dillon of Kilkenny-West" or "Robert Lord Dillon" fort short.

Third marriage 
Some time between 1622 and 1627 Dillon married thirdly Anne, daughter of Sir William Strode of Stoke sub Hamdon, Somerset, and widow of Henry Folliott, 1st Baron Folliott, who had died in 1622.

With Anne he had:
Carey (1627–1689), became the 5th Earl Roscommon

Later life 
Dillon was appointed a privy concillor in 1627. Dillon's mother died in 1628.

During the Irish Parliament of 1634–1635 Dillon was elected on 5 July 1634 as one of the two MPs for Trim Borough. On 14 July 1634, his father took his seat in the Irish House of Lords.

On 26 May 1638 Dillon was appointed one of the keepers of the great seal.

Lord Deputy Christopher Wandesford died on 3 December 1640. On 15 December Charles I appointed Lord Dillon (i.e. Lord Dillon of Kilkenny-West) together with Sir William Parsons Lords Justices of Ireland, but Dillon was considered to have been too closely associated with Strafford and was replaced on 30 December. John Borlase was appointed as his successor on 31 December 1640.

During the Irish Parliament of 1640–1649 Dillon was on 13 March 1640 again elected as one of the two MPs for Trim Borough. While he sat in the Commons, his father again sat in the Lords.

His father died in March 1641 and Dillon succeeded as the 2nd Earl of Roscommon. He took up his seat at the Irish House of Lords on 1 August 1641. His seat in the Commons was filled by James Whyte.

Death and timeline 
Lord Roscommon, as he was finally now, died on 27 August 1642 in Oxmantown, a quarter of Dublin's Northside. He was succeeded by his eldest son James as the 3rd Earl of Roscommon.

Notes and references

Notes

Citations

Sources 

 
  – 1603 to 1642
  – Abdy to Hutchinson (for Dillon)
  – Ibbetson to Zouche (for Roscommon)
  (for Strafford and Folliott)
 
 
  – N to R (for Roscommon)
 
  – Scotland and Ireland
  – (for timeline)
  – 1634 to 1699
  – Viscounts (for Dillon)
 
  – Parliaments & Biographies (PDF downloadable from given URL)
  – Banff to Cranstoun (for Blantyre)
  – Knights bachelors & Index
 
  – 1641 to 1643
 

 

 

1642 deaths
16th-century Irish people
17th-century Irish people
Earls of Roscommon
People of Elizabethan Ireland
Year of birth uncertain